Oybek Abdugafforov ( born 30 March 1995) is a Tajik footballer who currently plays for Alay Osh and the Tajikistan national football team.

Career

Club
In August 2017, Abdugafforov signed for FC Istiklol.

On 22 February 2019, FK Khujand announced the signing of Abdugafforov. On 4 January 2021, Khujand confirmed that Abdugafforov had left the club at the end of his contract and had signed for Alay Osh.

International
Abdugafforov was chosen for the 2015 Commonwealth of Independent States Cup squad for the Tajikistan national under-21 football team.

Abdugafforov made his senior debut in a friendly testimonial match against Syria commemorating the 20th anniversary of the independence of Tajikistan, with his second appearing coming against Palestine.

Career statistics

Club

International

Statistics accurate as of match played 12 October 2018

References

Tajikistani footballers
Tajikistan international footballers
Association football defenders
Living people
1995 births
Tajikistan Higher League players
FC Istiklol players
Regar-TadAZ Tursunzoda players
Tajikistan youth international footballers